The 1938–39 season was the 40th season in the history of Berner Sport Club Young Boys. The team played their home games at Stadion Wankdorf in Bern and placed 10th in the Nationalliga, and was then eliminated in the third round of the Swiss Cup.

Players
 Knuchel
 Achille Siegrist
 Louis Gobet
 Otto Hänni
 Hans Liniger
 Willy Terretaz
 Aldo Poretti
 Attilio Mordasini
 Max Horisberger
 Walter Streun
 Puigventos

Friendlies

Competitions

Overall record

Nationalliga

League table

Matches

Swiss Cup

References

BSC Young Boys seasons
Swiss football clubs 1938–39 season